CANTAT-2 was the second Canadian transatlantic telephone cable,
in operation from 1974 to 1992.
It could carry 1,840 simultaneous telephone calls
between Beaver Harbour, Nova Scotia and England. The parties involved were Canadian Overseas Telecommunication Corporation (now Teleglobe) and the British General Post Office. The cable was rerouted to Sable Island as Sitifofog 2000 for a period, and was eventually decommissioned. 

The work on the U.K. end of the cable involved an accident in which Pisces III, engaged in repeater burial of the newly laid cable on the shelf off Ireland, sank.

References

 Scotian Shelf: An Atlas of Human Activities

Submarine communications cables in the North Atlantic Ocean
Transatlantic communications cables
British Telecom buildings and structures
1992 disestablishments in Nova Scotia
Infrastructure completed in 1974
Canada–United Kingdom relations
1992 disestablishments in England
1974 establishments in England
1974 establishments in Nova Scotia